Wakunugoda Gayathri Irosha Dias (ගයාත‍්‍රි ඩයස්) [Sinhala]), popularly as Gayathri Dias, is an actress in Sri Lankan cinema and television. Apart from acting, she is also a beauty queen, a presenter, a beautician and a entrepreneur.

Personal life
Gayathri Dias was born in 1975 April 16 Matara as the second child of the family for Ranjith Henry Dias and Eujin Alahpperuma. She has one elder brother and one younger sister. Her father Ranjith worked at Czechoslovakian Embassy until retired. Gayathri went several schools for education. Methodist College, Samudradevi and Karunaratne Bauddhaloka Maha Vidyalaya are some of them. Her mother Eujin died due to COVID-19 on 13 June 2021.

She is married to popular actor and director Channa Perera. She met Channa during the teledrama Makara Vijithaya. They got married on September 26 in 1996. The couple has two daughters, Maleesha Parindya and Duasha Adithya. Elder daughter Maleesha completed education from Musaeus College. Duasha is currently studying at Royal Institute International School.

Acting career
At the age of 17, while doing GCE A/L she got an appointment as the receptionist at TNL TV. Her maiden teledrama acting came through New Year teledrama, Udaara Geethaya. Her maiden cinematic experience came through a supportive role in 2001 film Oba Magema Wewa, directed by V. Siwadasan. Some of her popular films are Suwanda Denuna Jeewithe, Yamaraja Siri and Seya.

Selected television serials

 Dadayam Bambaru
 Eheth Ehemai
 Hiru Daruwo
 Kakuluvo Makuluwo 
 Kolamba Ithaliya 
 Maha Viru Pandu 
 Makara Vijithaya
 Nataka Marai
 Nayanamina
 Neela Palingu Diya
 On Ataka Nataka
 Once Upon a Time in Colombo
 Paara Dige 
 Pabalu
 Queen
 Udaara Geethaya
 Yes Madam

Beyond acting
She participated to Miss Sri Lanka Contest in 1992 and won the 'Miss Photogenic' title. In 1994, she became 'Sirasa Ru Rajina' conducted by Maharaja Capital.

During Hair Asia Pacific 2003 competition, Dias won the most outstanding Sri Lankan performer’s trophy as well as first runner up award for Nail Art category.

She represented Sri Lanka at the Mrs Top of the World 2016 beauty pageant. In the pageant, she won the mini pageant titled ‘Mrs Talent’ for a modern Kandyan dance item. She ranked fifth place at the pageant.

Filmography

References

External links
 An accusation made by a female that her boy was grabbed away -- reply by Gayathri
 .hd;%S fmd,a .ia ke.mq yeá
 කට කතාවක් - Chat with Gayathri Dias
 Chat with Gayathri

Living people
Sri Lankan film actresses
1975 births